General elections were held in Eswatini on 18 August and 21 September 2018.

Electoral system
The House of Assembly consists of 59 elected seats and up to ten chosen by the Ngwenyama. The 59 elected members are elected in a two-round system. A primary election is held in each of the 385 chiefdoms to choose a candidate for the secondary election, with between three and twenty candidates in each chiefdom. In the secondary election, the country is divided into 59 constituencies (increased from 55 in the 2013 elections); each winner of the primary election then stands in the constituency that covers their chiefdom. Both rounds operate on a first-past-the-post basis, with all candidates running as independents.

Nominations
Prior to the general election, candidates are nominated at the tinkhundla level. Each of the 55 tinkhundla nominates between three and twenty candidates, who must have the backing of ten members of the community. A total of 6,204 people were nominated; 4,717 male and 1,487 female. 26% of candidates were below the age of 36, 63% were between 36 and 60, and 11% were over 60.

Primary election
The primary round took place on 24 August 2018, with 156,973 Swazis casting a vote out of a total of 544,310 registered voters, resulting in a 28.83% turnout. These numbers, which suggested a low confidence in the electoral process in the country, were later removed from the Electoral Commission website. They were briefly online as an annexure to a report released in November 2020.

Secondary election 
The electoral commission revealed the name of the 59 winners of the secondary election, yet without divulging any numbers of votes being cast for the candidates or in total. In 2013, these results had never been made public. Following the election, King Mswati appointed six members of the royal family to the House of Assembly and eight to the Senate. The results were revealed in the National Elections Report 2018.

Results
The results of the secondary election were revealed in the National Elections Report 2018.

Hhohho Region

References

Eswatini
Elections in Eswatini
General
Non-partisan elections
Eswatini
Eswatini